The Indore – Maksi Passenger is a passenger train of Indian Railways, which runs between Indore Junction railway station of Indore, the largest city & commercial hub of Central Indian state Madhya Pradesh and Maksi Junction railway station of Maksi, Madhya Pradesh.

Arrival and departure
Train no.59379 departs from Indore daily at 05:45 hrs. from platform no.5 reaching Maksi, the same day at 07:30.
Train no.59380 departs from Maksi, daily at 10:15 hrs., reaching Indore the same day at 12:00.

Route and halts
The train goes via Dewas Junction. The important halts of the train are:
 INDORE JUNCTION
 Indore Lakshmibai Nagar
 Dewas
 Ajitkheri
 MAKSI JUNCTION

Coach composite
The train consists of 12 chair car unreserved coaches.

Average speed and frequency
The train runs with an average speed of 35 km/h. The train runs on a daily basis.

Loco link
The train is hauled by Ratlam RTM WDM-3 Diesel engine.

Rake maintenance & sharing
The train is maintained by the Indore Coaching Depot. The same rake is used for Indore–Chhindwara Panchvalley Express, one way which is altered by the second rake on the other way.

References

Slow and fast passenger trains in India
Transport in Indore
Railway services introduced in 1999
Rail transport in Madhya Pradesh